Batman: White Knight is an American comic book published by DC Comics. The eight-issue limited series, written and illustrated by Sean Murphy, began monthly publication in October 2017 and concluded in May 2018. In the series, the Joker is seemingly cured of his madness and sets out to become a politician under his real name of Jack Napier, seeking to change his public image as a "villain" and save Gotham City from Batman, whom he views as the real enemy of the city.

A sequel titled Batman: Curse of the White Knight ran from July 24, 2019 to March 25, 2020. A second sequel, Batman: Beyond the White Knight, began publication on March 29, 2022 and concluded on December 27 of the same year.

Plot 
Batman, Batgirl and Nightwing pursue the Joker through Gotham City. While the Joker benignly weaves a two-wheeled hoverboard through the city, Batman recklessly chases him in the tank-like Batmobile, causing significant property damage and nearly killing multiple bystanders; from the passenger seat, Batgirl pleads with him to drive more carefully, but she is ignored. Nightwing follows on a motorcycle, saving a man from nearly being hit by the Batmobile.

Batman eventually corners the Joker and chases him on foot into a pharmaceutical warehouse. As he beats the Joker bloody, Batgirl, Nightwing and the GCPD gather to watch the one-sided fist fight. The Joker then goads Batman into force-feeding him a bottle of an unknown medication, saying that he can do more good for Gotham than Batman if he only took those pills. As he holds open the Joker's mouth and dumps the pills inside, Batman's allies watch in disgust; a mysterious woman in a red coat films the event and leaks it to the news. In light of the reckless Batmobile chase and the leaked footage, Gotham begins to debate over whether Batman is doing more harm than good. Barbara and Dick learn Bruce's violence stems from Alfred being near death, kept alive only by Freeze Tech. The Joker, now stable and using his real name, Jack Napier, wins a case against the GCPD for insufficient evidence and for non-intervention in his beating.

Freed, Napier visits Harley Quinn, who attacks him and insists he is not himself. Saved by a second Harley, Napier learns she is the original but was replaced: with the Joker's obsession culminating in Jason Todd's torture, Quinzel left to try and help Batman save Todd; in that flashback, Quinzel is seeing wearing the same red coat as the woman who filmed the Joker being force-fed the pills. She then tells the Joker that he unwittingly adopted a hostage named Marian Drews as the new Harley during a bank robbery.

Bruce and Victor Fries develop a treatment for cryogenic illnesses. Despite not being fully tested, Fries attempts to resuscitate Nora; anticipating this, Wayne hooks the system up to Fries' suit, curing him but aging him to his natural elderly state. Running for councilman, Napier funds construction of a library in the poor district of Backport and befriends Duke Thomas, an ex-GCPD officer who runs a local youth group. Meanwhile, Bruce discovers that many of his fellow billionaires have been profiting off of Batman by purchasing properties destroyed by Batman's battles and then flipping them after the city repairs them; Bruce is left shaken by this discovery. Using the Mad Hatter's tools to control Clayface, Napier gives Gotham's rogues gallery drinks secretly laced with his dust to control them by proxy.

Making the villains rampage across the city, Napier uses the distraction to access restricted documents and discovers a tax fund for Batman's collateral damage. In an attempt to move the villains to a less-populated area, Batman baits them into attacking Backport and Napier's library, thinking that they would not attack a property owned by the Joker; the villains proceed to damage Backport and raze the library. Injured when Napier's library crumbles, Bruce later collapses at Alfred's bedside; waking to find himself stabilized on Alfred's life-support, Bruce finds Alfred dead in the bedside chair. Dick and Barbara discuss whether to intervene in Bruce's developing obsession in convicting Napier. Drews, now the Neo Joker, recovers Clayface's remains, placing the villains under her control. When Batman intervenes in his protest, Napier goes willingly to the GCPD. Warning he knows of the collateral fund, he offers to reallocate it to the GCPD as councilman, giving Gotham a culpable Batman equivalent known as the GTO - the Gotham Terrorism Oppression unit.

The Neo Joker attacks the GCPD, prompting Gordon to side with Napier and place an APB on Batman. Batman asks Quinzel for help taking down Napier, convinced he is pulling a long con; Quinzel refuses, certain Napier is legitimate. Bested by the GTO, which has recruited Duke, Nightwing and Batgirl, Batman is arrested by Napier. The Neo Joker uses a revealed superweapon to freeze Gotham Harbor, demanding she be given the Joker. Earlier, Bruce discovered Thomas Wayne funded Fries Sr. to create Freeze-Tech, circumventing U.S. laws by tunneling under Gotham's German embassy; Fries Sr. later cut ties with Thomas to build the superweapon against his wishes.

Napier develops a tolerance to his medication, making him periodically revert into the Joker. Napier frees Batman, asking for help stopping the Neo Joker in exchange for a confession (provided Quinzel is not arrested). Napier, Batman and the GTO organize an assault on the Neo Joker's freeze ray, piloting a fleet of Batmobiles taken from Wayne Manor. During the assault, Napier attempts to focus on the Joker's memories and recalls that Todd is alive: the Joker drove Robin to hate Batman and reveal his identity. Napier explains he already knew Batman's identity, as all collateral taxes indirectly come from Wayne Enterprises. Making peace with Dick, Barbara and Gordon, Batman races through Gotham tunnels with Napier, who has reverted to the Joker. The GTO bests the Neo Joker's forces and reverses the freeze ray, flooding the tunnels. Overpowering the Neo Joker, the Joker releases Clayface and undoes the mind control. With Batman protecting him from Clayface, the Joker and Quinzel pursue the Neo Joker in the Batmobile; Napier returns and professes his love for Quinzel. Approaching a closing floodgate, Napier launches Quinzel through the gap in the Batcycle, causing him to crash. Quinzel beats and apprehends the Neo Joker and Batman saves Napier.

Confessing to his crimes, Napier surrenders and is granted a nicer Arkham cell and a wedding to Quinzel; as he finishes his vows, Napier permanently reverts to the Joker. Using Napier's remaining funds, Quinzel begins restoring Backport. Confronting Quinzel, Batman reveals she manufactured the Joker's medication and orchestrated events so the chase would end in the factory and be recorded. Explaining he only learned the truth from the Joker, Quinzel explains she did it to break their stalemate before they destroyed Gotham. Meeting with Gordon, Batman gives him the keys to the original Batmobiles for the GTO and confesses that Napier was right about him. Revealing that he has realized that he has been taking pleasure in harming criminals and that he has allowed himself to go too far in his war against crime, Batman unmasks himself in front of Gordon to earn back his trust.

Production

Development 

In July 2017, DC Comics announced the comic book limited series titled Batman: White Knight, with comic book creator Sean Murphy serving as its writer and illustrator. During an email interview with digital magazine Paste, Murphy revealed that he first came up with the idea for the story of Batman: White Knight when he was 12 years old while watching Batman: The Animated Series, and as he grew older, more he thought about the premise of the series, adding details and elements to its plot as time went on.

Writing 
In Batman: White Knight, the central premise for the series is about reversing the roles of Batman and the Joker, portraying the Joker as a hero and Batman as a villain. For Murphy, his goal was to portray a more realistic vision of Gotham City, where crime could not be stopped with a fist, namely Batman's methods; this led to Murphy turning the Joker into a politician, using the character's wit and charisma to win over the people of Gotham, with him saying: "Seeing Gotham for the first time with clear eyes, his psychosis now cured, he starts to understand the absurdity of vigilantism and how Batman's actions are only contributing to Gotham's endless crime cycle. Joker sets out to beat Batman by becoming the White Knight that Gotham really needs".

While writing Batman: White Knight, Murphy created a new version of the character Duke Thomas, basing him on the Marvel Comics superhero Luke Cage as a source of inspiration. According to Murphy, Duke represents the poor communities that are oppressed and neglected in Gotham. Originally, Murphy planned to have Duke take on the mantle of Robin, but was discouraged from doing so by his team. In the White Knight universe, Jason Todd was the first Robin instead of Dick Grayson as in most comics. As stated by Murphy, this change was not intentional, but was actually the result of a timeline error that went unnoticed by him. However, by the time he realized it, it was too late to correct this and he decided to adopt the shift.

DC had no problems with the ideas that Murphy had for the series, like changing the timeline in Batman's history. However, the adult content, such as nudity and profanity, that Murphy intended to include was not allowed.

Design 
About the design of the Batmobile, Murphy explained his approach to the vehicle's appearance: "I brought some specific stuff, like from F-1 cars. I wanted my Batmobile to be a cross between a rock tumbler and a sports car, like you would see elements from a Ferrari and a Humvee. This is a very different Batmobile. No matter what I threw at it, I wanted to keep classic elements".

Influences 
For Batman: White Knight, Murphy drew influences from a variety of Batman-related media, including television series, live-action films, and video games. Murphy revealed that the Joker's real name in Batman: White Knight is Jack Napier, a reference to Tim Burton's 1989 Batman film, in which the Joker (played by Jack Nicholson) also shares that name. The Batmobile from that film,  along with the Tumbler featured in Christopher Nolan's The Dark Knight Trilogy, also inspired the look of Murphy's version of the car in the comic book. Additionally, one of the series' subplots involves a freeze ray used to encase a portion of Gotham in ice, a nod to the 1997 film Batman & Robin.

Publication 
Batman: White Knight was written and illustrated by Sean Murphy, with color from Matt Hollingsworth and lettering by Todd Klein. It was initially intended to be a seven-issue story, but was extended to eight after the release of the first issue, which was published by DC on October 4, 2017, while the final issue was released on May 9, 2018. A trade paperback collecting all eight issues was released on October 9, 2018, being the first graphic novel published under the DC Black Label — an imprint designed to allow writers to submit their own unique interpretations of traditional DC Universe (DCU) characters for a more mature audience. A hardcover edition of Batman: White Knight was released on May 15, 2019. A deluxe edition of the series was published on March 4, 2020.

Issues

Reception

Popularity 
Upon its release, Batman: White Knight quickly became one of the most popular Batman comics in recent years, with its massive success causing it to be compared to some of the greatest Batman comics of all time, such as The Dark Knight Returns, Batman: The Long Halloween, Batman: Earth One and other series. It debuted at #1 on BookScan's bestseller list, tracking its purchase levels across online stores and major retailers like Amazon, Barnes & Noble, Walmart, Target Books, independent bookstores, and other places. The series also took the top spot on Diamond Comic Distributors' list of graphic novels for the month of October 2018. The overwhelming purchase of the book by fans prompted DC to publish a second printing of Batman: White Knight.

Critical response 
Batman: White Knight has been received favorably by critics and audiences alike.

Future

Murphyverse 

In March 2020, DC was reportedly interested in creating a mini imprint centered around Murphy's works, which was made possible primarily by the massive success of Batman: White Knight. Referred to as the "Murphyverse", the imprint serves as one of the DC Black Label lines, intending to feature limited series developed by writers and artists other than Murphy, and those series, in turn, will be set in the shared universe first established in the White Knight series.

Sequels

Batman: Curse of the White Knight 

A sequel series titled Batman: Curse of the White Knight, with Murphy returning as writer and illustrator, began publishing on July 24, 2019, and concluded on March 25, 2020, as a title under the DC Black Label imprint. It is set after the events of Batman: White Knight, and follows the Joker recruiting the vigilante Azrael to aid him in his latest scheme against Batman, which involves exposing a shocking secret about the Wayne family's legacy and its influence throughout Gotham City's history since its founding.

Batman: Beyond the White Knight 

A second sequel series, Batman: Beyond the White Knight, was published under the DC Black Label imprint on March 29, 2022 with Murphy once again serving as writer and illustrator for the third volume. It is based on the animated television series Batman Beyond, and takes place twelve years succeeding the story of Batman: Curse of the White Knight, with the plot revolving around young Terry McGinnis, who becomes the new Batman to avenge his father's murder at the hands of corrupt CEO Derek Powers, all while a middle-aged Bruce Wayne escapes from prison to stop Terry.

See also 
 Tokyo Ghost, another comic book series illustrated by Murphy.

References

External links 
  at DC Comics.com
  at IGN

2017 in comics
2018 graphic novels
American comics
Batman graphic novels
Batman storylines
Batman titles
Comic book limited series
Comics by Sean Murphy
Comics publications
DC Comics limited series
DC Comics titles
Murphyverse
Politics in fiction
Superhero comics